The IX International Franz Liszt Piano Competition took place in Utrecht from March 25 to April 8, 2011. The competition was won by Masataka Goto. Olga Kozlova and Oleksandr Poliykov were awarded the 2nd and 3rd prizes.

Jury and results
  Lucas Vis (chairman)
  Arnaldo Cohen
  Nikolai Demidenko
  Cristina Ortiz
  Enrico Pace
  Jerome Rose
  Mūza Rubackytė
  Tamás Vásáry
  Jan Wijn

See also
 International Franz Liszt Piano Competition

References
 Alink-Argerich Foundation [Results -> Netherlands: Utrecht 'Liszt']

External links
 Official website

2011
2011 in music
2011 in the Netherlands
March 2011 events in Europe
April 2011 events in Europe
History of Utrecht (city)
Events in Utrecht (city)